Anopheles introlatus (formerly Anopheles balabacensis introlatus) is the main vector for Plasmodium cynomolgi (a simian malaria) in Malaya.

References 

introlatus